The Liberal Constitutional Party (Ḥizb al-aḥrār al-dustūriyyīn) was an Egyptian political party founded in 1922 by a group of politicians who left the Wafd Party.

History
The Liberal Constitutional Party was founded in 1922 during a meeting chaired by Adli Yakan Pasha, and some time later the party launched a newspaper, the Al Siyasa (The Politics). Several Wafd-origin liberals like Muhammad Mahmoud Pasha, Muhammad Husayn Haykal and Ali Mahir Pasha joined the party. Although the Wafd Party was nationalist and conservative views, the new party supported the constitution which was approved on 19 April 1923, the secularization of the State, the United Kingdom and also the total unification of Egypt and Sudan. Muhammad Alluba, a supporter of the Palestine cause, served as the general secretary of the party in the 1930s. It was banned, like the other political parties in Egypt, after the coup d'état of 1952.

Leaders
1922-1933 – Adli Yakan Pasha
1933-1941 – Muhammad Mahmoud Pasha
1941-1952 – Ali Mahir Pasha

Electoral history

House of Representatives elections

References

External links

1922 establishments in Egypt
1952 disestablishments in Egypt
Political parties established in 1922
Political parties disestablished in 1952
Liberal parties in Egypt
Defunct political parties in Egypt
Banned political parties in Egypt